The Notre-Dame school or the Notre-Dame school of polyphony refers to the group of composers working at or near the Notre-Dame Cathedral in Paris from about 1160 to 1250, along with the music they produced.

The only composers whose names have come down to us from this time are Léonin and Pérotin. Both were mentioned by an anonymous English student, known as Anonymous IV, who was either working or studying at Notre-Dame later in the 13th century. In addition to naming the two composers as "the best composers of organum," and specifying that they compiled the big book of organum known as the Magnus Liber Organi, he provides a few tantalizing bits of information on the music and the principles involved in its composition. Pérotin is the first composer of organum quadruplum—four-voice polyphony—at least the first composer whose music has survived, since complete survivals of notated music from this time are scarce.

Léonin, Pérotin and the other anonymous composers whose music has survived are representatives of the era of European music history known as the ars antiqua. The motet was first developed during this period out of the clausula, which is one of the most frequently encountered types of composition in the Magnus Liber Organi.

While music with notation has survived, in substantial quantity, the interpretation of this music, especially with regard to rhythm, remains controversial. Three music theorists describe the contemporary practice: Johannes de Garlandia, Franco of Cologne, and Anonymous IV. However, they were all writing more than two generations after the music was written, and may have been imposing their current practice, which was quickly evolving, on music which was conceived differently. In much music of the Notre-Dame School the lowest voices sing long note values while the upper voice or voices sing highly ornamented lines, which often use repeating patterns of long and short notes known as the "rhythmic modes". This marked the beginning of notation capable of showing relative durations of notes within and between parts.

Notre-Dame motets
The earliest motets are the Notre-Dame motets, written by composers such as Leonin and Perotin during the 13th century. These motets were polyphonic, with a different text in each voice, and employed the rhythmic modes. An example of a Notre-Dame motet is Salve, salus hominum/O radians stella/nostrum by Perotin, composed between 1180 and 1238.

Contemporary accounts 
With polyphony, musicians were able to achieve musical feats perceived by many as beautiful, and by others, distasteful. John of Salisbury (1120–1180), philosopher and Bishop of Chartres, who taught at the University of Paris during the years of Léonin but before Pérotin, was one of the latter. He attended many services at the Notre-Dame Choir School. In his Policraticus he offers a first-hand description of what was happening to music in the High Middle Ages, writing:

References

Further reading 
 History of Music at Notre-Dame de Paris (in French)
 Bradley, Catherine A. 2018. Polyphony in Medieval Paris: The Art of Composing with Plainchant. Cambridge University Press. 
 Gleason, Harold and Becker, Warren.  Music in the Middle Ages and Renaissance (Music Literature Outlines Series I).  Bloomington, Indiana.  Frangipani Press, 1986. 
 "Notre Dame School," "Organum," "Léonin," "Pérotin," in Sadie, Stanley ed. The New Grove Dictionary of Music and Musicians.  20 vol.  London, Macmillan Publishers Ltd., 1980. 

Composition schools
French music history
Notre-Dame de Paris
Medieval Paris
Music organizations based in France
Ars antiqua